Japan competed at the 1992 Summer Paralympics in Barcelona, Spain. 76 competitors from Japan won 20 medals and finished 16th in the medal table.

See also 
 Japan at the Paralympics
 Japan at the 1992 Summer Olympics

References 

Japan at the Paralympics
1992 in Japanese sport
Nations at the 1992 Summer Paralympics